Boris Mikhailovich Matveyev (born 19 February 1970) is a former Russian professional footballer.

Club career
He made his professional debut in the Soviet Top League in 1987 for FC Zenit Leningrad. He played 1 game in the UEFA Cup 1989–90 for FC Zenit Leningrad.

References

1970 births
Footballers from Saint Petersburg
Living people
Soviet footballers
Russian footballers
Russian expatriate footballers
Expatriate footballers in Kazakhstan
Russian Premier League players
FC Zenit Saint Petersburg players
Maccabi Tel Aviv F.C. players
Expatriate footballers in Israel
FC Lokomotiv Nizhny Novgorod players
FC Moscow players
FC Kyzylzhar players
Soviet Top League players
Russian expatriate sportspeople in Kazakhstan
Association football midfielders
FC Dynamo Saint Petersburg players
FC Irtysh Omsk players